The William Shipsey House, located at 1266 Mill St. in San Luis Obispo, California, is a historic house that is listed on the National Register of Historic Places.  It was designed by architect Hilamon Spencer Laird and includes Queen Anne and Stick/Eastlake elements.  It was built in 1894 for William Shipsey.  It is significant historically for its association with Shipsey and for it serving as "an excellent example of local design and craftsmanship."

See also 
 City of San Luis Obispo Historic Resources

References 

Houses in San Luis Obispo County, California
Buildings and structures in San Luis Obispo, California
Houses on the National Register of Historic Places in California
National Register of Historic Places in San Luis Obispo County, California
Stick-Eastlake architecture in California